The molecular formula C11H16N2O (molar mass: 192.26 g/mol, exact mass: 192.1263 u) may refer to:

 A-84,543
 para-Methoxyphenylpiperazine (MeOPP)
 Pozanicline
 Tocainide

Molecular formulas